The Sol Cat 18 is a double handed multihull catamaran produced by Sol Catamarans, Inc. from 1973–1979.

Background

The original designed Sol Cats were designed by Gene Vernon and with a symmetrical hull, intended to be a similar yet faster version of the highly successful hobie cats, matching their dimensions very closely. In 1979 Sol Cat was absorbed by the North American Catamaran Racing Association and the Sol Cat designs were used as baselines for the similar NACRA design catamarans.

Description
The Sol Cat 18 is the most common of the Sol cat family of boats, with the 15 and 20 foot models having very similar design. Rigging and support structure is aluminum with hulls constructed symmetrically of molded fiberglass with vacuum foam sandwich throughout. The primary difference between the Hobie 18 and the Sol Cat is the straight hull design with daggerboards, giving the Sol Cat faster speeds given better sea conditions. A number of minor differences exist between the two boats to include the centerline support beam running between the two aluminum hull supports, and the rudder spar extending forward of the mainsheet.

The age of the Sol Cats has led to a large number of extensively modified versions of the original boat by owners. Trapeze integration is very common, all the way to owners extending the centerline support beam forward into a gennaker boom.

See also
 List of sailboat designers and manufacturers
 Hobie Cat
 Tornado

References

External links
 Media
 Data

Catamarans